Kelty (Scottish Gaelic: Cailtidh) is a former coal mining village located in Fife, Scotland. Lying in the heart of the old mining heartlands of Fife, it is situated on the Fife/Kinross-shire boundary and has a population of around 6,000 residents.  This was nearer to 9,000 when the coal mining industry was still operational in late 1970s and early 1980s.

Origins

The origin of the name of the village is somewhat obscure. It could come from the Scottish Gaelic coillte or coilltean meaning 'wood' or 'woodland' or it could come from the Gaelic cailtidh, a reduced form of the early Gaelic *caleto-dubron, meaning 'hard water'. In either case, it was probably originally a Pictish name that was later adapted to Gaelic.

The town began around 1850 as a mining town linked to several coal mines in the area, mainly owned by the Fife Coal Company and continued to expand with the increase of mines until 1930.

Kelty is located next to the main Edinburgh to Perth road, the M90 motorway, and as a result of this has seen many houses built primarily for commuters to Edinburgh over the past five years.

Kelty has two primary schools, St. Joseph's and Kelty Primary. After primary school, the majority of pupils go on to Beath High School, a comprehensive school in Cowdenbeath, or the local Roman Catholic school, St Columba's High School in Dunfermline. Kelty also has a modern community centre, and a modern library.

The local football team is Kelty Hearts. In 2022 they were promoted to League 1 for the first time as League 2 champions.

Church

Kelty was part of the parish of Beath (Cowdenbeath) and had a quoad sacra mission church erected in 1894. The mission was upgraded to a chapel in 1897, its minister being Rev George Hunter MA who went to Liverpool in 1903. He was replaced by Rev William Henderson Adam who went to Calderbank in 1919 and was replaced by Rev William Thomson. It was given status as a separate parish, disjoined from Cowdenbeath, in 1925.

War Memorial

The war memorial was erected in 1921 and was designed by sculptor William Birnie Rhind.

Notable people

Claire Baker, MSP for Mid-Scotland and Fife
Stephen Husband, professional footballer
Willie Penman, professional footballer
Willie Rennie, Leader of the Scottish Liberal Democrats (2011–2021)
Alex Rowley, Deputy Leader of the Scottish Labour Party (2015–17)
Robert Stewart, Draughts World Champion (1922-1933)

Sport
Kelty Hearts won Scottish League Two in 2022, having been promoted from the Lowland League in 2021.

Blairadam House

Blairadam House, just north of Kelty but on the west side of the M90, was the long-term home of the Adam family: William Adam, Robert Adam, John Adam, William Adam of Blair Adam, Charles Adam etc.

References

External links
 
 Kelty on Fife Council website
 Kelty on Scottish Mining Website 

 
Towns in Fife
Mining communities in Fife